This is a timeline of Chilean history, comprising important legal and territorial changes and political events in Chile and its predecessor states.  To read about the background to these events, see History of Chile. See also the list of governors and presidents of Chile.

Pre-Columbian Chile

16th century

17th century

18th century

19th century

20th century

21st century

See also
 Timeline of Santiago de Chile history

Notes

References

Bibliography

Chile history-related lists
Chilean